Gliese 784 is a single red dwarf star located in the southern constellation of Telescopium that may host an exoplanetary companion. The star was catalogued in 1900, when it was included in the Cordoba Durchmusterung (CD) by John M. Thome with the designation CD -45 13677. It is too faint to be viewed with the naked eye, having an apparent visual magnitude of 7.96. Gliese 784 is located at a distance of 20.1 light-years from the Sun as determined from parallax measurements, and is drifting closer with a radial velocity of −33.5 km/s.

This is a small M-type main-sequence star with a stellar classification of M0V. It is much younger than Sun at 0.85 billion years. Despite this, it appears to be rotating slowly with a period of roughly 48 days. The star has 58% of the mass and 58% of the radius of the Sun. It is radiating just 6% of the luminosity of the Sun from its photosphere at an effective temperature of 3,754 K.

Planetary system  

In June 2019 one planet candidate was reported in orbit around Gliese 784. Since 2020, the star is suspected to be surrounded by a disk of cold dust, but the signal may be also due to a background extragalactic source.

References

M-type main-sequence stars
Hypothetical planetary systems
Circumstellar disks

Telescopium (constellation)
J20135335-4509506
CD-45 13677
0784
191849
099701